Ancistrocerus parietinus  is a Palearctic species of potter wasp.

References

External links
Images representing Ancistrocerus parietinus

Hymenoptera of Europe
Potter wasps
Insects described in 1761
Taxa named by Carl Linnaeus